The Apollo program was a United States human spaceflight program carried out from 1961 to 1972 by the National Aeronautics and Space Administration (NASA), which landed the first astronauts on the Moon. The program used the Saturn IB and Saturn V launch vehicles to lift the Command/Service Module (CSM) and Lunar Module (LM) spacecraft into space, and the Little Joe II rocket to test a launch escape system which was expected to carry the astronauts to safety in the event of a Saturn failure. Uncrewed test flights beginning in 1966 demonstrated the safety of the launch vehicles and spacecraft to carry astronauts, and four crewed flights beginning in October 1968 demonstrated the ability of the spacecraft to carry out a lunar landing mission.

Apollo achieved the first crewed lunar landing on the Apollo 11 mission, when Neil Armstrong and Buzz Aldrin landed their LM Eagle in the Sea of Tranquility and walked on the lunar surface, while Michael Collins remained in lunar orbit in the CSM Columbia, and all three landed safely on Earth on July 24, 1969.

Two Apollo missions were failures: a 1967 cabin fire killed the entire Apollo 1 crew during a ground test in preparation for what was to be the first crewed flight; and the third landing attempt on Apollo 13 was aborted by an oxygen tank explosion en route to the Moon, which disabled the CSM Odyssey'''s electrical power and life support systems, and made the propulsion system unsafe to use. The crew circled the Moon and were returned safely to Earth using the LM Aquarius'' as a "lifeboat" for these functions.

Uncrewed test flights

From 1961 through 1967, Saturn launch vehicles and Apollo spacecraft components were tested in uncrewed flights.

Saturn I
The Saturn I launch vehicle was originally planned to carry crewed Command Module flights into low Earth orbit, but its  payload capacity limit could not lift even a partially fueled Service Module, which would have required building a lightweight retrorocket module for deorbit. These plans were eventually scrapped, in favor of using the uprated Saturn IB to launch the Command Module with a half-fueled Service Module for crewed Earth orbit tests. This limited Saturn I flights to Saturn launch vehicle development, CSM boilerplate testing, and three micrometeroid satellite launches in support of Apollo.

There was some incongruity in the numbering and naming of the first three uncrewed Apollo-Saturn (AS), or Apollo flights.  This is due to AS-204 being renamed to Apollo 1 posthumously. This crewed flight was to have followed the first three uncrewed flights. After the fire which killed the AS-204 crew on the pad during a test and training exercise, uncrewed Apollo flights resumed to test the Saturn V launch vehicle and the Lunar Module; these were designated Apollo 4, 5 and 6. The first crewed Apollo mission was thus Apollo 7. Simple "Apollo" numbers were never assigned to the first three uncrewed flights, although renaming AS-201, AS-202, and AS-203 as Apollo 1-A, Apollo 2 and Apollo 3, had been briefly considered.

Saturn IB
The Saturn I was converted to the Uprated Saturn I, eventually designated Saturn IB, by replacing the S-IV second stage with the S-IVB, which would also be used as the third stage of the Saturn V with the addition of on-orbit restart capability.

Two suborbital tests of the Apollo Block I Command and Service Module, one S-IVB development test, and one Lunar Module test were conducted. Success of the LM test led to cancellation of a planned second uncrewed flight.

Launch escape system tests

From August 1963 to January 1966, a number of tests were conducted at the White Sands Missile Range for development of the launch escape system (LES). These included simulated "pad aborts", which might occur while the Apollo-Saturn space vehicle was still on the launch pad, and flights on the Little Joe II rocket to simulate Mode I aborts which might occur while the vehicle was in the air.

Saturn V
Prior to George Mueller's tenure as NASA's Associate Administrator for Manned Space Flight starting in 1963, it was assumed that 20 Saturn Vs, with at least 10 unmanned test flights, would be required to achieve a crewed Moon landing, using the conservative one-stage-at-a-time testing philosophy used for the Saturn I. But Mueller introduced the "all-up" testing philosophy of using three live stages plus the Apollo spacecraft on every test flight. This achieved development of the Saturn V with far fewer uncrewed tests, and facilitated achieving the Moon landing by the 1969 goal. The size of the Saturn V production lot was reduced from 20 to 15 units. 

Three uncrewed test flights were planned to human-rate the super heavy-lift Saturn V which would take crewed Apollo flights to the Moon. Success of the first flight and qualified success of the second led to the decision to cancel the third uncrewed test.

Alphabetical mission types

The Apollo program required sequential testing of several major mission elements in the runup to a crewed lunar landing. An alphabetical list of major mission types was proposed by Owen Maynard in September 1967. Two "A-type" missions performed uncrewed tests of the CSM and the Saturn V, and one B-type mission performed an uncrewed test of the LM.  The C-type mission, the first crewed flight of the CSM in Earth orbit, was performed by Apollo 7.

The list was revised upon George Low's proposal to commit a mission to lunar orbit ahead of schedule, an idea influenced by the status of the CSM as a proven craft and production delays of the LM. Apollo 8 was reclassified from its original assignment as a D-type mission, a test of the complete CSM/LM spacecraft in Earth orbit, to a "C-prime" mission which would fly humans to the Moon.  Once complete, it obviated the need for the E-type objective of a medium Earth orbital test.  The D-type mission was instead performed by Apollo 9; the F-type mission, Apollo 10, flew the CSM/LM spacecraft to the Moon for final testing, without landing.  The G-type mission, Apollo 11, performed the first lunar landing, the central goal of the program.

The initial A-G list was expanded to include later mission types:  H-type missions—Apollo 12, 13 (planned) and 14—would perform precision landings, and J-type missions—Apollo 15, 16 and 17—would perform thorough scientific investigation.  The I-type objective, which called for extended lunar orbital surveillance of the Moon, was incorporated into the J-type missions.

Crewed missions

The Block I CSM spacecraft did not have capability to fly with the LM, and the three crew positions were designated Command Pilot, Senior Pilot, and Pilot, based on U.S. Air Force pilot ratings. The Block II spacecraft was designed to fly with the Lunar Module, so the corresponding crew positions were designated Commander, Command Module Pilot, and Lunar Module Pilot regardless of whether a Lunar Module was present or not on any mission.

Seven of the missions involved extravehicular activity (EVA), spacewalks or moonwalks outside of the spacecraft. These were of three types: testing the lunar EVA suit in Earth orbit (Apollo 9), exploring the lunar surface, and retrieving film canisters from the Scientific Instrument Module stored in the Service Module.

Canceled missions 

Several planned missions of the Apollo program were canceled for a variety of reasons, including changes in technical direction, the Apollo 1 fire, hardware delays, and budget limitations.

 Before the Apollo 1 fire, two crewed Block I spacecraft missions were planned, but then it was decided that the second one would give no more information about the spacecraft performance not obtained from the first, and could not carry out extra activities such as EVA, and was canceled.
 The Saturn V's all-up testing strategy and relatively good success rate accomplished the first Moon landing on the sixth flight, leaving ten available for Moon landings through Apollo 20, but waning public interest in the program led to decreased Congressional funding, forcing NASA to economize. First,  was cut to make a Saturn V available to launch the Skylab space station whole instead of building it on-orbit using multiple Saturn IB launches. Eight months later, Apollo 18 and 19 were also cut to further economize, and because of fears of increased chance of failure with a large number of lunar flights.

See also
There were two NASA post-Apollo crewed spaceflight programs that used Apollo hardware:
 Skylab § Mission designations – space laboratory missions lasting up to 83 days
 Apollo–Soyuz – first joint US / Soviet crewed spaceflight

Notes

References

Bibliography

External links
 NASA page on Apollo Missions
 National Space Science Data Center (Goddard Space Flight Center): Apollo Program with links to books on Program
 Space.com List of Apollo Missions.
 AstronomyToday List of Missions
 Project Apollo Flickr Photo Archive

 

Apollo
Apollo